Sebastiano Galeati (8 February 1822 – 25 January 1901) was an Italian prelate of the Catholic Church who served as Bishop of Macerata and Tolentino from 1881 to 1887 and Archbishop of Ravenna from 1887 until his death. He was made a cardinal in 1890.

Biography 
Sebastiano Galeati was born in Imola on 8 February 1822.

He was ordained a priest on 21 September 1844.

On 4 August 1881, Pope Leo XIII appointed him Bishop of Macerata and Tolentino. He received his episcopal consecration from Cardinal Raffaele Monaco La Valletta on 14 August. 

On 23 May 1887, he was named Archdiocese of Ravenna.

Pope Leo made him a cardinal on 23 June 1890 and then assigned him the titular church of San Lorenzo in Panisperna.

He died in Ravenna on 25 January 1901.

References

External links

1822 births
1901 deaths
People from Imola
Archbishops of Ravenna
Cardinals created by Pope Leo XIII